Events from the year 1782 in Denmark.

Incumbents
 Monarch — Christian VII
 Prime minister — Ove Høegh-Guldberg

Events
 22 June  HDMS Det Store Bælt is launched at Bodenhoffs Plads in Copenhagen.

Undated

Births
11 October – Steen Steensen Blicher, author (died 1848)
1 November – Adam Ditlev Wedell-Wedellsborg, government official (died 1827)

Deaths

 May 25 — Vigilius Eriksen, painter (born 1722)
 July 17 – Peter Cramer, painter (born 1726)
 August 31 – Niels Egede – merchant and missionary (born 1710)
 October 28 — Princess Charlotte Amalie, princess of Denmark (born 1706)

References

 
1780s in Denmark
Denmark
Years of the 18th century in Denmark